The DH.83 Fox Moth was a successful small biplane passenger aircraft from the 1930s powered by a single de Havilland Gipsy Major I inline inverted engine, manufactured by the de Havilland Aircraft Company.

The aircraft was designed late in 1931 as a low cost and economical light passenger aircraft. Many components including the engine, tailplane, fin, rudder and wings were identical to those being used for the de Havilland DH.82 Tiger Moth then being built in large quantities as a military trainer. These were fitted to the purpose-built wooden, plywood-covered fuselage  (longerons: ash forward of the pilot, aft Sitka spruce). The pilot sat in a raised cockpit behind the small enclosed passenger cabin, which was usually fitted with three seats for short-range hops. The "Speed Model" was fitted with a canopy and fairing. The wings folded for space saving storage.

Operational history

The prototype first flew on 29 January 1932, and was sent to Canada gaining sufficient interest that seven were assembled at the company's Toronto plant. "Home" based production was shared evenly between sales within the United Kingdom and exports, with 49 aircraft each going onto the British register and being sent overseas. British-based aircraft were mostly used on short-haul joyrides or as feeder flights around the British Isles. The DH.83 Fox Moth was the first aircraft to earn a profit in commercial airline service without subsidies.

Fox Moth VH-UQM Miss Currie was purchased by Victor Holyman for £1,450 and began operating over the 108-mile route over south-eastern Bass Strait between Launceston, Tasmania and Whitemark on Flinders Island in October 1932. It was thus the inaugural aircraft of what was to later become Australian National Airways. QANTAS used Fox Moths to replace de Havilland DH.50s on the Flying Doctor Service.

Total production of the DH.83/DHC.83C Fox Moth was 153, being 98 in England, two in Australia and 53 in Canada after WWII. A number of different engines were used, including the 130 hp (97 kW) Gipsy IIIA on most British-built aircraft and the 145 hp (108 kW) Gipsy Major 1C on the 53 postwar DH.83C Canadian-built aircraft. The DHC-83Cs were fitted with larger pilot cockpit openings, a larger windscreen and canopy, a large ambulance cabin door on the port side to accommodate a stretcher, and did not have folding wings. The DH.83C used DH.82 Tiger Moth main and tail landing gear. The DH.83C was an excellent and economical bush plane.

Variants
 DH.83 Fox Moth: Light transport biplane; 98 built in the United Kingdom, plus two more in each of Australia and Canada.
 DH.83C Fox Moth: 53 aircraft were built in Canada after World War II.
 Gasuden KR-1: This was an unlicensed Japanese-built copy of the Fox Moth powered by a 150 hp (112 kW) Gasuden Jimpu 3 radial engine. The first prototype, J-BBJI named Chidorigo (Plover) flew on 23 December 1933. Seven KR-1s were built.
 Gasuden KR-2: The KR-1 design with modified wings and other tweaks

Operators

Military

 Royal Australian Air Force

 Brazilian Air Force
 Brazilian Naval Aviation

 Royal Canadian Air Force

 Royal New Zealand Air Force
 No. 42 Squadron RNZAF

 South African Air Force

 Spanish Republican Air Force

 Spanish Air Force

 Fleet Air Arm

 Royal Yugoslav Air Force

Civilian

 Adastra Airlines
 Tasmanian Aerial Services

 Tata Airlines

 Wardair Canada

 Air Travel (NZ) Ltd, later National Airways Corporation operated three aircraft.

 Blackpool and West Coast Air Services
 Giro Aviation
 Hillman's Airways
 Midland & Scottish Air Ferries
 North West Air Services
 Northern & Scottish Airways
 Olley Air Service
 Provincial Airways
 Scottish Motor Traction

 Aeroput

Survivors

 DH.83 G-ACEJ was active in the UK in 2010, but since 2015 has been registered in Munich, Germany, regularly appearing at displays and meetings (still with its UK civil reg). The aircraft actually starred on film, in the 1957 British Transport Films production Holiday which sees the aircraft taking off from Blackpool Beach whilst undergoing pleasure flights. 
 DH.83C G-AOJH
        ZK-ADI active in New Zealand in 2016
        ZK-AGM active in New Zealand in 2019 after rebuild in UK
        ZK-APT active in New Zealand in 2019
        ZK-AQB active in New Zealand in 2020
 DH.83  VH-UJJ ex-G-ACEB active in Australia in 2009
        C-FYPM ex-ZK-AEK active in Canada in 2018
        VH-UVL active in Australia in 2018
C-FDIX Under restoration to airworthy condition at Buffalo Airways by Buffalo Joe McBryan and the PLANE SAVERS! crew in Yellowknife, NWT, Canada with the aim of having it flying by the spring of 2020.
VH-UUS Under restoration at MothCair by Greg Challinor, Murwillumbah NSW, Australia

Specifications (DH.83)

See also

References
Notes

Bibliography

 Hotson, Fred W. The de Havilland Canada Story. Toronto: CANAV Books, 1983. .
 Jackson, A. J. British Civil Aircraft 1919-1972: Volume II. London: Putnam (Conway Maritime Press), 1988. .
 Jackson, A.J. De Havilland Aircraft since 1909. London: Putnam, (Third ed.)1987. .
 Mikesh, Robert C. and Shorzoe Abe. Japanese Aircraft 1910-1941. London: Putnam, 1988. .
 Milberry, Larry. Aviation In Canada. Toronto: McGraw-Hill Ryerson Ltd., 1979. .
 Molson, Ken M. and Harold A. Taylor. Canadian Aircraft Since 1909. Stittsville, Ontario: Canada's Wings, Inc., 1982. .

External links

 The de Havilland Moth Club
 Those Kiwi Moths

Biplanes
Single-engined tractor aircraft
1930s British civil utility aircraft
Fox Moth
Fox Moth
Aircraft first flown in 1932